Ellen Louise Grindvold (born July 30, 1946) is a former Norwegian female basketball and professional tennis player. She played for the Norwegian Fed Cup team in 1983.

References

External links
Profile at snl.no

1946 births
Living people
Norwegian women's basketball players
Norwegian female tennis players